West Minot is an unincorporated village in the town of Minot, Androscoggin County, Maine, United States. West Minot has a post office with ZIP code 04288.

References

Villages in Androscoggin County, Maine
Villages in Maine